Florian Keller (born October 3, 1981 in Berlin) is a field hockey player from Germany and the brother of Natascha Keller. He was a member of the Men's National Team that won the gold medal at the 2008 Summer Olympics.

References
The Official Website of the Beijing 2008 Olympic Games

External links
 

1981 births
Living people
German male field hockey players
Olympic field hockey players of Germany
Field hockey players at the 2008 Summer Olympics
Olympic gold medalists for Germany
Field hockey players from Berlin
Olympic medalists in field hockey
Medalists at the 2008 Summer Olympics